Thomas Muster defeated Sergi Bruguera in the final, 3–6, 7–6(7–5), 6–2, 6–3 to win the men's singles tennis title at the 1995 Italian Open.

Pete Sampras was the defending champion, but was defeated in the first round by Fabrice Santoro.

Seeds

  Pete Sampras (first round)
  Michael Chang (quarterfinals)
  Goran Ivanišević (semifinals)
  Wayne Ferreira (semifinals)
  Alberto Berasategui (first round)
  Yevgeny Kafelnikov (first round)
  Thomas Muster (champion)
  Sergi Bruguera (final)
  Jim Courier (first round)
  Todd Martin (second round)
  Marc Rosset (first round)
  Stefan Edberg (quarterfinals)
  Andrea Gaudenzi (second round)
  Andriy Medvedev (third round)
  Karel Nováček (first round)
  Jonas Björkman (quarterfinals)

Draw

Finals

Top half

Section 1

Section 2

Bottom half

Section 3

Section 4

External links
 ATP Singles draw

Men's Singles